This is a list of the extreme points of Iran.

Towns, cities, and Islands
Westernmost — Sīlū Ma‘qūl, West Azarbaijan at 
Easternmost — Kuhak, Sistan and Baluchestan Province at 
Geographical certre — Markar Clock Tower, Yazd

Elevation extremes
Lowest point: Caspian Sea level: −28 m
Highest point: Mount Damavand: 5,610 m

See also
Extreme points of Earth
Geography of Iran

Geography of Iran
Extreme
Iran